Ballintober South, also called Ballintober West, is a barony in County Roscommon, Republic of Ireland.

Etymology
Ballintober South is named after Ballintober town; however, it does not actually contain that town, which is located in Castlereagh barony.

Geography

Ballintober South is located in the centre of County Roscommon, northwest of Lough Ree.

History

The Ó Manacháin (O'Monaghans) were lords of the "Three Tuathas", and in AD 866 were rulers of this area, known as Ui Briuin na Sionna (O'Brien of the Shannon). In 1249, they were overthrown by the O'Beirnes (Ó Birn).

The O'Mooneys were chiefs of Clann-Murthuile, also believed to be in Ballintober South.

List of settlements

Below is a list of settlements in Ballintober South:
Cloontuskert
Kilteevan
Roscommon

References

Baronies of County Roscommon